A showgirl is a dancer or performer in a stage entertainment show.

Showgirl(s) may also refer to:

Business 
 Promotional model, a model active at product presentation events, etc.

Films and plays 
 Show Girl (1928 film), starring Alice White
 Show Girl (1929 musical), by the Gershwins and others
 The Showgirl, a 1960 Spanish musical film
 Show Girl (1961 musical), by Charles Gaynor
 Showgirls, a 1995 film directed by Paul Verhoeven

Music 
 Showgirl (album), a 2004 digital live album by singer Kylie Minogue
 "Show Girl" (The Auteurs song), the debut single by The Auteurs
 "Show Girl" (Slimmy song), a song 2008 on Slimmy's album Beatsound Loverboy
 Showgirl: The Greatest Hits Tour, the first Greatest Hits tour by Kylie Minogue
 Showgirl (video)
 Showgirl: The Homecoming Tour, the conclusion to Minogue's "Showgirl Tour"
 Showgirls (soundtrack), the soundtrack album to the 1995 film Showgirls
 "Showgirl" (Mumzy Stranger song), a song by Mumzy Stranger, featuring Veronica Mehta, from his 2010 mixtape No Stranger To This

See also
Showgirl in Hollywood, a 1930 musical comedy/drama film